Brownie  was an unincorporated community located in Muhlenberg County, Kentucky, United States. It eventually became part of Central City.

Notable people
Don Everly, one of the Everly Brothers, a rock 'n roll duo

References

Unincorporated communities in Muhlenberg County, Kentucky
Unincorporated communities in Kentucky